Łabędzie (which means "swans" in Polish) may refer to the following places:
Łabędzie, Łódź Voivodeship (central Poland)
Łabędzie, West Pomeranian Voivodeship (north-west Poland)

See also
Łabędź coat of arms